Hans Koller (born Landshut, 10 November 1970) is a German-born UK-based jazz pianist. His debut album Magic Mountain (1997) established him as one of the leading new jazz composers in the UK.

References

German jazz pianists
1970 births
Living people
21st-century pianists